Milltown may refer to:
 Mill town, a settlement that developed around one or more mills

Places

Canada
Milltown, New Brunswick
Milltown, Newfoundland and Labrador
Milltown, Ontario

Ireland
Milltown, Ballymore, a townland in Ballymore civil parish, barony of Rathconrath, County Westmeath
Milltown, Churchtown, a townland in Churchtown civil parish, barony of Rathconrath, County Westmeath
Milltown, County Cavan
Milltown, County Kerry
Milltown, County Galway
Milltown, County Kildare
Milltown, Dublin, a suburb of Dublin
Milltown, Faughalstown, a townland in Faughalstown civil parish, barony of Fore, County Westmeath
Milltown Malbay, a town in County Clare
Milltown, Pass of Kilbride, a townland in Pass of Kilbride civil parish, barony of Fartullagh, County Westmeath
Milltown, Rathconrath, a townland in Rathconrath civil parish, barony of Rathconrath, County Westmeath

New Zealand
 Milltown, Canterbury, a locality in Selwyn District
 Milltown, West Coast, a locality in Westland District

United Kingdom
Milltown, Cardinham, a location in Cardinham parish, Cornwall
Milltown, Lanlivery, a hamlet near Lostwithiel, Cornwall
Milltown, Derbyshire, a village
Milltown, County Antrim, a village in Northern Ireland
Milltown, County Down, a townland in County Down, Northern Ireland
Milltown, County Tyrone, four townlands in County Tyrone, Northern Ireland
Milltown of Rothiemay, a small inland village within the Moray council area, Scotland

United States
Milltown, Alabama
Milltown, Arkansas
Milltown, Delaware
Milltown, Georgia
Milltown, Indiana
Milltown, Kentucky
Milltown, Maine
Milltown, Missouri
Milltown, Montana
Milltown, Hunterdon County, New Jersey
Milltown, New Jersey, in Middlesex County
Milltown, South Dakota
Milltown, Tennessee
Milltown, Virginia
Milltown, West Virginia
Milltown, Wisconsin, a village within the town of Milltown
Milltown (town), Wisconsin

Sports
Milltown GAC, Gaelic Athletic Association club in Galway, Ireland
Milltown (stadium), home ground of Warrenpoint Town F.C., Northern Ireland
Glenmalure Park or Milltown, the former home of Shamrock Rovers F.C., Dublin, Ireland

Other uses
HMCS Milltown, a 1942 Bangor-class minesweeper
Milltown Cemetery, a cemetery in Belfast, Northern Ireland
Milltown Reservoir Superfund Site, a site on the Clark Fork River Basin in Montana
Milltown River, in County Westmeath, Ireland
Earl of Milltown, title in the Peerage of Ireland
RAF Milltown, a former Royal Air Force station near Elgin, Scotland

See also
Miltown, a brand name for the mild tranquilizer meprobamate
Milton (disambiguation)
Milltown, Ireland (disambiguation)
Milltown GAA (disambiguation), sports clubs that share the name 'Milltown GAA'